Porceyo is a parish of the municipality of Gijón / Xixón, in Asturias, Spain. Its population was 693 in 2012.

Porceyo borders the districts of Tremañes and Roces in the north, and combines rural, industrial and roadway system areas.

Villages and its neighbourhoods
El Barrio Vega
La Vegona
La Veguina
Casares
Buracos
La Cerca Baxo
Bareza
Calacierbes
El Monte Fano
La Reguera
La Cerca Riba
La Robellada

External links
 Official Toponyms - Principality of Asturias website.
 Official Toponyms: Laws - BOPA Nº 229 - Martes, 3 de octubre de 2006 & DECRETO 105/2006, de 20 de septiembre, por el que se determinan los topónimos oficiales del concejo de Gijón.

Parishes in Gijón